Melrose, Ontario may refer to:

Melrose, Hastings County, Ontario
Melrose, Middlesex County, Ontario